"True Love" (styled "TRUE LOVE") is a single by Japanese recording artist Fumiya Fujii. It was released on November 10, 1993. It was number-one on the Oricon Weekly Singles Chart. It was the 29th best-selling single in Japan in 1993, with 806,000 copies sold, the 11th best-selling single in Japan in 1994, with 1.213 million copies sold and it is the 20th best-selling physical single in Japan, having sold a total of 2.023 million copies.

Track listing

Weekly charts

References

1993 singles
1993 songs
Japanese-language songs
Oricon Weekly number-one singles
Pony Canyon singles
Song articles with missing songwriters